Grecia Dolores Colmenares Mieussens (born December 7, 1962 in Valencia, Venezuela) is a Venezuelan actress.

Biography 
Grecia Dolores Colmenares Mieussens was born on December 7, 1962, in  Valencia, Venezuela. She is the daughter of a Venezuelan father and a French mother. She pursued her education at school Lisandro Ramírez and at the Liceo Malpica. She studied theater with the director and playwright Miguel Torrence.

Personal life 
In 1978, she met Henry Zakka on recordings of Drama de amor en el Bloque 6. In 1979, when Grecia was 17 years old, she married the actor, Henry Zakka. The couple divorced in 1983.

In 1986, a few months after arriving in Buenos Aires, Argentina, she met the Argentine businessman Marcelo Pelegri. In 1986, she married Marcelo Pelegri. On September 4, 1992, she gave birth to the couple's first child, a boy, whom they called Gianfranco Pelegri Colmenares, who was born in the Clínica Maternidad Suizo Argentina. The couple divorced in 2005.

Grecia Colmenares has obtained Argentine citizenship.

Career 
Grecia Colmenares became a sensation as a young actress in her native Venezuela during the 1970s, becoming a favorite of the general public in that country. She made her debut, as an eleven-year-old, in the Angelica Spanish soap opera. She continued participating in other soap operas through her teenage years, including the major hits Estefanía in 1979 and Elizabeth in 1980. Those major hits were followed by a number of lesser known soap operas, as well as other hits, such as 1981's Marielena and, in 1984, Azucena and Topacio. In 1991, she starred in the famous soap opera Manuela, which obtained a huge success worldwide, and Colmenares won several prizes for her outstanding job as Isabel and Manuela. 

Although her jobs in Venezuela gave her considerable international fame, it was after she moved to Argentina that Colmenares became paparazzi fodder. Colmenares then became a household name across Latin America. She appeared frequently on the covers of gossip and fashion magazines, and rumors of a rivalry with Andrea Del Boca surfaced, although these rumors lasted for a short period only. In 1999, Colmenares acted in a telenovela that Del Boca had previously participated in: Chiquititas, which had by then become a major international hit. In 2001, she was seen in Miami, Florida, trying to get a contract with Univision. Nevertheless, she was not able to get contracted by that network. In Venezuela, Colmenares and Victor Camara formed a popular on-camera couple, starring together in a number of soap operas. In 2006, Grecia Colmenares is evaluating the offers many studios made her, and deciding the contract she will sign to return to the soap operas.

Filmography

Television

Theater

Television Programs

Awards and nominations

External links
 

1962 births
Living people
Argentine telenovela actresses
People from Valencia, Venezuela
People with acquired Argentine citizenship
Venezuelan child actresses
Venezuelan emigrants to Argentina
Venezuelan telenovela actresses
Bailando por un Sueño (Argentine TV series) participants